Rejs, known in English as The Cruise (or The Trip Down the River), is a Polish comedy film released in 1970, directed by Marek Piwowski who also co-wrote the screenplay with Andrzej Barszczyński, Janusz Głowacki and Jerzy Karaszkiewicz. The score was composed by Wojciech Kilar.

Rejs is considered as a masterpiece by many and as the earliest cult film in Polish cinema. Shot in a quasi-documentary style, with a cast featuring not more than two or three professional actors, the absurd plot parodies life in the People's Republic of Poland, reducing a weekend river cruise to a hilarious parody of the entire communist system.

A stowaway (Stanisław Tym) sneaks aboard a ship departing on a cruise down the Vistula River. The captain takes him for a Communist Party cultural coordinator and the intruder gladly adapts to his new role, immediately setting to work at manipulating the passengers and crew into silly and vaguely humiliating games. Before long, Tym has got everyone under his thumb and created his own comedic dictatorship. A memorable performance was given by Jan Himilsbach, an amateur actor who formerly carved tombstones.

Quotes 
 But what voting system can be used to select the method of voting?
 It's time for actions, not words. Now let me speak.

See also 
Cinema of Poland
List of Polish language films
River cruise

External links
 Official website (Polish)
 Poster gallery
 
 
 Rejs at Culture.pl
 Rejs at The National Film Archive’s Digital Repository

1970s Polish-language films
Polish comedy films
1970 films
1970 comedy films
Films scored by Wojciech Kilar